is an Australian journalist, broadcaster and presenter living in Sydney.

Taguchi is currently host of Insight on SBS.

Early life
Born in Melbourne, Victoria, Australia to her Japanese father, Akira Taguchi and Australian mother. Taguchi grew up in rural New South Wales learning classical violin from the age of five, and won a scholarship to study music at the University of Wollongong.

Career
Working at ABC Local Radio she pursued her passions for writing and film.

On graduating in 1997, Taguchi worked on The 7.30 Report and at the Triple J national radio station.

In 2004, Taguchi moved to Hong Kong and in 2007 began producing and anchoring news and current affairs programmes for STAR TV, Asia Television and NHK World.

Returning to Australia in 2010, Taguchi worked at both the ABC and SBS before settling at the Australian Broadcasting Corporation.

In 2013, Taguchi completed a series of adventurous assignments, including reporting on the experience of running her first marathon near Uluru, reporting on the Blue Mountains bush fires and sailing on a 70-foot yacht in the Sydney to Hobart yacht race.

In 2014, she spent two weeks documenting the experience of those being treated in a hospital for those suffering from posttraumatic stress disorder. Taguchi has also been an ambassador for mental health awareness.

In 2014, she was appointed presenter of ABC News Afternoons on ABC News. Taguchi remained presenter of ABC News Afternoons until December 2017. She moved into a new role in 2018 focusing more on Compass and hosting other programs across ABC TV.

In 2015, Taguchi filled in as the host of the Drive radio show on 702 ABC Sydney. She has also backfilled as co-anchor of ABC News Breakfast with Michael Rowland, and Virginia Trioli.

In March 2017, Taguchi was appointed host of Compass, replacing Geraldine Doogue.

In April 2017, Taguchi presented segments during Star Gazing Live hosted by Professor Brian Cox and Julia Zemiro at Australia's Siding Spring Observatory.

In January 2018, she filled in as the host of 7.30, the show that she had first worked on 20 years earlier at the start of her career. On 25 April 2018, she hosted 7.30 again. She also announced she had been signed on by Simon & Schuster to write a memoir that would be published the following year.

In October 2018, Taguchi hosted the Invictus Games opening and closing ceremonies in Sydney which were broadcast around the world. She shared the stage with the athletes and Invictus patron Prince Harry, Duke of Sussex.

For Christmas 2019, Taguchi became part of an effort to write Christmas music appropriate to Australia, resulting in a 59 minute documentary Christmas Sounds Better This Year aired and repeated in the weeks before Christmas. Five individuals and groups, Luke O'Shea (composer), Phoenix Voices of Youth (choir), The Soldiers Wife (choir and creative group), Moorambilla Voices (an indigenous singing group), and Keys of Life, were engaged to create music. Taguchi was an active part of the creative process, including rehearsing for and playing the violin for one of the resulting concerts where the music was premiered.

In November 2020, SBS announced that Taguchi would be the new host for their current affair program Insight.

She works as a facilitator with her husband Mark Dando at consultancy Rabbit and Lion.

Personal life
Taguchi was married to fellow journalist Hugh Riminton between 2005 and 2006. They share custody of their daughter Coco who was born in November 2005. She married Mark Dando in 2014.

References

1975 births
ABC News (Australia) presenters
Journalists from Melbourne
Journalists from New South Wales
Australian people of Japanese descent
Living people
Australian women television journalists